Hilal Öztürk (born 21 February 2002) is a Turkish judoka. She won a bronze medal at the  2022 Judo Grand Slam Baku.

She won a bronze medal at the 2021 European U23 Judo Championships, in Budapest. She won a silver medal at the 2022 World Judo Juniors Championships in Guayaquil.

References

External links
 
 
 

2002 births
Living people
Turkish female judoka